Henry Lincoln  (1930-2022) is a British author, television presenter, scriptwriter, and actor.

Henry Lincoln may also refer to:

Henry Lincoln (MP) (died 1397), MP for Canterbury

See also

Henry Lincoln Johnson (1870–1925), African-American attorney and politician